LCU may refer to:

 Landing Craft Utility
 Largest coding unit, the basic processing unit of the High Efficiency Video Coding (HEVC) video standard 
Last Chance U, a documentary series
 Lego City Undercover, a video game
 Limited Contact Unit, a class of fictional artificially intelligent starship in The Culture universe of late Scottish author Iain Banks
 Lokesh Cinematic Universe, an Indian Tamil-language shared universe of action thriller films created by Lokesh Kanagaraj
 Local colleges and universities in the Philippines
 Local currency unit
 Lookahead Carry Unit
 Lubbock Christian University